Seoca may refer to:

 Seoca, Bosnia and Herzegovina, a village near Goražde
 Seoca, Bar, a village in Bar Municipality, Montenegro
 Seoca, Andrijevica, a village in Andrijevica Municipality, Montenegro
 Seoca, Podgorica, a village in Podgorica Municipality, Montenegro
 , a village near Omiš

See also
 Seoce (disambiguation) (Cyrl: Сеоце)
 Selca (disambiguation) (Cyrl: Селца)
 Selce (disambiguation) (Cyrl: Селце)